Paul Smith (born July 2, 1984) is a former American professional gridiron football quarterback. He played college football at Tulsa.

High school career
Smith attended Deer Creek High School in Edmond, Oklahoma for two years, then finished high school at Owasso High School in Owasso, Oklahoma.  He set a state high school passing record with 9,574 yards in 4 seasons.

College career
Arriving at Tulsa in 2003, Smith played in eight games as a true freshman.  He sat out the 2004 season as a redshirt, then became the Golden Hurricane's starting quarterback in 2005.  He led Tulsa to a 9–4 record and the Conference USA title. He capped off the 2005 season with a 31–24 win over Fresno State in the 2005 Liberty Bowl (Tulsa's first bowl win since 1991); Smith passed for 234 yards and a touchdown, and also ran for the winning touchdown.  Smith was named the game's most valuable player.

In 2006, Smith was tagged as one of Conference USA's top quarterbacks in preseason, along with such players as future Philadelphia Eagles quarterback Kevin Kolb, and was widely recognized as the leader and face of the Tulsa football program.  In Tulsa's scheme, Smith threw many screen passes to running backs Tarrion Adams, Courtney Tennial, and wide receiver Idris Moss. The Golden Hurricane jumped out to a stellar 7–1 start with the inside track on a second straight West Division championship, but the team experienced a breakdown amid turmoil resulting from rumors of teams trying to woo away coach Steve Kragthorpe.  Tulsa lost its contest against Utah in the Armed Forces Bowl 25–13, making their season record stand at 8–5.

In 2007, Smith led the Golden Hurricane to a 10–4 record and a win in the 2008 GMAC Bowl while also winning the 2007 Conference USA player of the year award  In 2007, Smith won the Wuerffel Trophy which goes to the top humanitarian in college football  and was a finalist for the Draddy Trophy. He was also selected to play in the 2008 Cornerstone Hula Bowl, where he passed for 47 yards and ran for the game's first two touchdowns for the winning Aina (East) team.

A three-year starter with the Golden Hurricane, Smith threw a combined 83 touchdown passes while taking his team to 3 straight bowl appearances.  Smith holds the NCAA record with 14 consecutive games passing for more than 300 yards. Smith also shares in a NCAA record as the only team to have a 5,000 yard passer, three 1,000 yard receivers, and a 1,000 rusher in the same season.

Professional career

Jacksonville Jaguars
Smith was not selected in the 2008 NFL Draft and was signed as an undrafted free agent by the Jacksonville Jaguars on April 28. Jacksonville immediately waived their third-team quarterback, allowing Smith to take his spot on the roster.

On July 31, 2008 Smith was waived by the Jaguars. On August 31, Smith was re-signed to the Jaguars' practice squad. He was waived on August 30, 2009 to make room on the roster for Todd Boeckman.

Montreal Alouettes
In October 2009, Smith took a position as assistant chaplain at the University of Tulsa, apparently ending his playing career.

After spending the next year out of football and briefly taking a position as a financial adviser, Smith signed a two-year contract with the Montreal Alouettes of the CFL on February 2, 2011. He was released during training camp by the Alouettes.

See also
 List of Division I FBS passing yardage leaders

References

External links
 Jacksonville Jaguars bio
 Tulsa Golden Hurricanes bio

1984 births
Living people
People from Owasso, Oklahoma
Players of American football from Oklahoma
American football quarterbacks
Tulsa Golden Hurricane football players
Jacksonville Jaguars players
Montreal Alouettes players
Sportspeople from Edmond, Oklahoma